Kings is a 1983 Australian television series dealing with the working-class King family living in Sydney. It was the first drama series produced by PBL Productions and ran for 19 hour-long episodes that began on 12 July 1983 on the Nine Network.

Cast
 Ed Devereaux as George King
 Melissa Jaffer as Rose King
 Dennis Grosvenor
 Scott Burgess
 Arkie Whiteley
 Simon Burke
 Deborra-Lee Furness
 Terence Cooper
 Arna-Maria Winchester
 Max Cullen
 Kim Krejus
Mark Kounnas

External links
Kings at the National Film and Sound Archive
Kings at the Internet Movie Database

1983 Australian television series debuts
1983 Australian television series endings
Australian drama television series
Nine Network original programming
Television shows set in New South Wales